Silas White (born 1977) is a Canadian publisher, editor, author, musician, songwriter and politician.

Early life and education
White grew up in a literary household in Pender Harbour, British Columbia, where his parents Howard and Mary White operated Harbour Publishing, one of British Columbia's major book publishers. White worked at Harbour Publishing during his youth and co-authored Local Heroes, a history of the Western Hockey League while still in high school. He attended the University of British Columbia on a President's Scholarship, receiving a BA in 1999 and moved to Toronto, where he pursued his interest in indie rock music, writing songs and performing in venues around the city with his band Electric Fences. In August 2019 he released a retroactive album of Electric Fences recordings from 15 years prior, Retroact 2001-2004, with Vancouver indie label Kingfisher Bluez. White now lives in Gibsons, British Columbia with his daughters Simone (b. 2007) and Eloise (b. 2010). In 2011 he received a master's degree in public administration from the University of Victoria.

Publishing
In the early 2000s he took over the historic Canadian literary press, Nightwood Editions Ltd. (formerly blewointment, founded by bill bissett), and began publishing poetry and fiction by Canadian writers such as Renée Sarojini Saklikar, Elizabeth Bachinsky, Tim Bowling, Rita Wong, Philip Kevin Paul, Laisha Rosnau, Ray Hsu, Rob Winger, Sandy Pool, Joe Denham, Kayla Czaga, Doretta Lau, Raoul Fernandes, Danny Ramadan, Carol Rose GoldenEagle, Adele Barclay and jaye simpson. Under his leadership Nightwood Editions became the flagship press for the generation of literary writers who emerged in Canada during the 2000s. White has also pursued an independent career as editor and author, serving as contributing editor of the Encyclopedia of British Columbia and editing both prose and poetry for other Canadian publishers, including Raincoast Books, ECW Press, Harbour Publishing and Saturday Night Magazine. One of his editing jobs, The Fly in Autumn by David Zieroth, won the 2010 Governor General's Award for Poetry, Canada's highest literary honour.

Elected office
A community activist since his teens, in 2005 White was elected to the Board of Education at School District 46 Sunshine Coast. In 2007 he was selected by his colleagues as board chair, the youngest person to hold that post in British Columbia. He also served as a Director and Vice-Chair of the British Columbia Public School Employers' Association until Premier Christy Clark replaced the board with a public administrator to exercise direct control over teacher bargaining by the provincial government.

In 2014 he left the board of School District 46 to run as councillor for the Town of Gibsons, topping the poll. As a councillor he represented the Town for two years at the Sunshine Coast Regional District and led initiatives to improve a major intersection; start a homeless shelter; expand the local, self-sustaining water service; and secure federal land for a provincial supportive housing facility. He also collaborated regionally with Josie Osborne, Lisa Helps and others to start the British Columbia Social Procurement Initiative, the first of its kind in Canada.

After returning to Nightwood Editions and working as a local government consultant in homelessness, housing, economic development, water stewardship, public engagement and Indigenous relations, White ran for mayor of Gibsons in 2022, winning with 82.4% of the vote.

References

General reference
 Moore, John (2006). "Award Winners Follow B.C. Publisher White", The Vancouver Sun, February 18, 2006.
 Hanson, Cheri and Weiler, Derek (2009) "12 to Watch", Quill & Quire, March, 2009.

Bibliography
 1993: Local Heroes: A History of the Western Hockey League (Harbour Publishing) 
 1999: The Encyclopedia of British Columbia (Harbour Publishing) 

Living people
1977 births
Canadian book publishers (people)
Canadian non-fiction writers
People from Gibsons, British Columbia